Rommie Lee Lewis, Jr. (born September 2, 1982) is an American former professional baseball pitcher.

His father, also named Rommie, was named after World War II German field marshal General Erwin "The Desert Fox" Rommel

Career

Baltimore Orioles
He was selected by the Baltimore Orioles in the fourth round (113th overall selection) of the 2001 Major League Baseball Draft. He was given a $287,500 signing bonus.

Toronto Blue Jays
Lewis signed as a free agent with the Toronto Blue Jays on January 20, 2009, spending the 2009 season with the Triple-A Las Vegas 51s. Lewis was called up to the Toronto Blue Jays on April 26, 2010. On August 16, 2011, he had his contract purchased by Toronto. He had posted a 3-3 record in Triple-A with a 6.60 earned run average and 4 saves. He elected free agency on October 21.

Bridgeport Bluefish
Lewis signed a contract with the Bridgeport Bluefish of the Atlantic League of Professional Baseball of Independent League for 2012 season. He was named to the 2012 Atlantic League All Star team.

Arizona Diamondbacks
Lewis received an invitation to MLB Spring Training by the Arizona Diamondbacks. He was released at the end of Spring Training.

York Revolution
Lewis pitched for the York Revolution of the Atlantic League of Professional Baseball, making it his second consecutive year in Independent Ball. He became a free agent after the 2015 season.

Lancaster Barnstormers
On February 28, 2017, Lewis signed with the Lancaster Barnstormers of the Atlantic League of Professional Baseball. He became a free agent after the 2017 season.

References

External links

CPBL

1982 births
Living people
American expatriate baseball players in Canada
American expatriate baseball players in Taiwan
Baseball players from Seattle
Bowie Baysox players
Bridgeport Bluefish players
Delmarva Shorebirds players
EDA Rhinos players
Estrellas Orientales players
American expatriate baseball players in the Dominican Republic
Frederick Keys players
Gulf Coast Orioles players
Lamigo Monkeys players
Lancaster Barnstormers players
Las Vegas 51s players
Major League Baseball pitchers
Navegantes del Magallanes players
American expatriate baseball players in Venezuela
New Hampshire Fisher Cats players
Tigres de Aragua players
Toronto Blue Jays players
York Revolution players